Albert "Lefty" Gerheauser (June 24, 1917 – May 28, 1972) was a professional baseball player who pitched in the Major Leagues for five seasons (1943-46 and 1948), for the Philadelphia Phillies, Pittsburgh Pirates and St. Louis Browns. He played in the minor leagues for eight seasons, mainly in the New York Yankees' system, before making the major leagues.

References

External links

1917 births
1972 deaths
Major League Baseball pitchers
Philadelphia Phillies players
Pittsburgh Pirates players
St. Louis Browns players
Baseball players from St. Louis
Rogers Cardinals players
Rogers Lions players
Joplin Miners players
Wenatchee Chiefs players
Kansas City Blues (baseball) players
Newark Bears (IL) players
Montreal Royals players
Toledo Mud Hens players
San Antonio Missions players
Seattle Rainiers players
Oklahoma City Indians players
Texarkana Bears players
Houston Buffaloes players